Louise English is an English actress.  She was a regular performer on The Benny Hill Show from 1978 to 1986, as an actress and in dance group Hill's Angels (the show ran from 1955 to 1991), and has performed in West End plays and nationally touring musical-theatre productions.

Early life and education
Louise's mother, Elizabeth (Liz) English, was an actress, singer, and dancer who appeared in Evening Stars, a review that toured with Benny Hill during his early showbusiness career. Liz appeared in Oliver! alongside Ron Moody and later worked for the BBC.

Louise began dancing at the age of two-and-a-half years. As a child, she won a scholarship to, and for ten years attended, the Stella Mann School of Dancing in London, where she passed examinations in classical ballet and modern dance and completed her academic schooling. She also attended the Anna Scher Theatre School and turned down the opportunity to attend the Royal Ballet School, preferring to concentrate on the acting side of her career.

Early career
While at ballet school, English was chosen to appear in the classic children's film Bugsy Malone (1976) in the role of the ballerina. Soon after, she was selected as the 1977 Butlin's Holiday Princess.

While still in school, she auditioned for a place with Pan's People, a nationally touring dance troupe, and was offered a contract. After completing her schooling she began a year filled with television appearances, cabaret, theatre, trade shows, modelling at fashion shows, and appearing in television commercials. After appearing at an Isle of Wight showcase, singing became an important part of English's career and she formed her own group, Patches, which played at London clubs.

Television
English was chosen by Benny Hill to be one of the original members of Hill's Angels on The Benny Hill Show and earned a role as a featured performer. She spent eight years on The Benny Hill Show, dancing with Hill's Angels and occasionally performing supporting roles in sketches with the show's titular writer and host.  She also was the featured performer in song-and-dance numbers, performing renditions of classic songs including "La Vie en Rose", "Pour Un Flirt Avec Toi", "Paradise", and "Milord".

English appeared on other television shows, including playing the role of Lucia Morella in five episodes of the popular BBC series Brush Strokes and filming the pilot for the BBC game show Full Swing. English was also a featured guest on the Central TV entertainment specials Elkie and Our Gang with Elkie Brooks and Gemma Craven, Saturday Royal, and Entertainment Express (all choreographed by Nigel Lythgoe), Dream Alley, and Starburst. Additional TV credits include Fresh Fields, Lytton’s Diary, Full House, Chance in a Million, Give Us a Clue, and Don’t Rock the Boat (all for Thames TV), and guest appearances on the Mike Yarwood Show. She has also appeared in EastEnders.

Theatre, feature films, musicals and pantomimes
English starred in cabaret in England, the Channel Islands, and Bangkok, performed Shakespeare, and appeared in minor parts in feature films, including The Wicked Lady (1983) with Faye Dunaway, Denholm Elliott, and John Gielgud, and House of the Long Shadows (1983) with Vincent Price, Christopher Lee, John Carradine, and Peter Cushing.

She has starred as leading lady in many comedies and dramas, including Absent Friends, Suddenly at Home, Tommy Boy, Don't Dress For Dinner, Bedside Manners, and Shadow of Doubt.

English is a veteran of several national tours, including nine months as the lead in Mike Harding's comedy Fur Coat and No Knickers, Ted Willis' play Tommy Boy, Tom Lehrer's Tom Foolery, Oscar Wilde's An Ideal Husband, and Russ Abbot's Madhouse. She travelled to Stockholm to perform a role in Neil Simon's I Ought To Be In Pictures.

She played the lead role of Louise in Gypsy: A Musical Fable at the Crucible Theatre, played Bella Spellgrove in a national tour and on the cast-recorded CD of Sherlock Holmes – The Musical, and was the female vocal lead in Maxwell – The Musical and Italian Idol – The Musical.

She also appeared in the national tour of My Dearest Ivor, an original musical that honoured Ivor Novello. In this show, she played eight roles and sang ten songs. English performed dramatic roles as Bella Manningham in the Victorian thriller Gaslight, as Sybil Chase in Private Lives, and as Liz in Shadow of Doubt.

She has played the principal girl or boy in over ten pantomimes throughout the UK, including Babes in the Wood, Aladdin, Jack and the Beanstalk, Dick Whittington, Mother Goose, The Bells of Notre Dame, and a record-breaking run of Snow White.

2000 onwards

Further reading

References

External links

1962 births
Living people
People from Bow, London
20th-century British actresses
21st-century British actresses
British film actresses
British television actresses
British voice actresses
British child actresses